Đỗ Quang Em (Ninh Thuận, Annam, Indochina, France (under the occupation of Japan), 1942 – 3 August 2021) was a Vietnamese painter based in Saigon, South Vietnam, then Ho Chi Minh City, Vietnam. He graduated from Gia Định College of Fine Arts (Cao Đẳng Mỹ Thuật Gia Định) in 1965. Along with contemporaries such as Đỗ Thị Ninh (1947-) he was one of the generation of painters who emerged in the early 1980s which rebelled against the traditions of the French EBAI and afterward socialist schools of Vietnamese art. He was for a period sent to a re-education camp. Since 1994 Em mainly exhibited in Hong Kong and overseas, and has had his paintings purchased by Bill Clinton.

References

External links
 Do Quang Em

1942 births
2021 deaths
20th-century Vietnamese painters
People from Ninh Thuận province
People from Ho Chi Minh City
20th-century male artists
21st-century Vietnamese painters
21st-century male artists
Male painters